Al Hudaiba is a locality in Dubai, United Arab Emirates (UAE). A small community, Al Hudaiba is located near Port Rashid.

Important landmarks in Al Hudaiba include Chelsea Hotel and the consulate of Sri Lanka. The locality is bordered by Al Mina, Port Rashid, Al Jafiliya, and Al Bada.

References 

Communities in Dubai